Hansruedi Jost (29 March 1934 – 29 March 2016) was a Swiss athlete. He competed in the men's hammer throw at the 1960 Summer Olympics.

References

External links
 

1934 births
2016 deaths
Athletes (track and field) at the 1960 Summer Olympics
Swiss male hammer throwers
Olympic athletes of Switzerland
People from Aarau
Sportspeople from Aargau